Barnett Parker (September 11, 1886 – August 5, 1941) was a British actor.

Biography
He appeared in the films The Misleading Lady, Roaming Lady, The President's Mystery, Adventure in Manhattan, Born to Dance, We Who Are About to Die, Dangerous Number, The Last of Mrs. Cheyney, Espionage, Ready, Willing, and Able, Personal Property, Married Before Breakfast, The Emperor's Candlesticks, Wake Up and Live, Broadway Melody of 1938, Double Wedding, Live, Love and Learn, Navy Blue and Gold, Love Is a Headache, Sally, Irene and Mary, Hold That Kiss, Marie Antoinette, Listen, Darling, The Girl Downstairs, She Married a Cop, Babes in Arms, At the Circus, He Married His Wife, La Conga Nights, Hit Parade of 1941, Hullabaloo, One Night in the Tropics, Love Thy Neighbor, The Reluctant Dragon, Tall, Dark and Handsome, A Man Betrayed, Kisses for Breakfast and The Great Awakening, among others.

Parker died at the Cedars of Lebanon Hospital in Los Angeles on August 5, 1941 after a series of heart attacks. He was survived by two sisters.

Filmography

References

External links

 

1886 births
1941 deaths
20th-century British male actors
British male film actors
British expatriate male actors in the United States